DKK may refer to:

 Danish krone, by ISO 4217 currency code
 Deutsches Klima-Konsortium, see German Climate Consortium
 Dil Kya Kare, a 1999 Hindi film
 Dakka language of Sulawesi, Indonesia (ISO code: dkk)
 Chautauqua County/Dunkirk Airport, New York State (IATA code: DKK)